Casa Venegoni is a historic building situated in Milan, Italy.

History 
The building was built between 1923 and 1927.

Description 
The building features a Liberty style, the Italian declination of the Art Nouveau, with strong Neogothic influences. A tower crowned by a loggia characterizes the corner of its façades.

Gallery

References

External links

Buildings and structures in Milan